The Pholcidae are a family of araneomorph spiders. The family contains over 1,800 individual species of pholcids, including those commonly known as cellar spider, daddy long-legs spider,  carpenter spider, daddy long-legger, vibrating spider, gyrating spider, long daddy, and skull spider. The family, first described by Carl Ludwig Koch in 1850, is divided into 94 genera.

The common name "daddy long-legs" is used for several species, especially Pholcus phalangioides, but is also the common name for several other arthropod groups, including harvestmen and crane flies.

Appearance
Pholcids are thin and delicate arachnids. The body, resembling the shape of a peanut, is approximately 2–10 mm (0.08–0.39 inch) in length, and the legs may be up to 50 mm (1.97 inches) long. Pholcus and Smeringopus have cylindrical abdomens and eyes arranged in two lateral groups of three and two smaller median contiguous eyes. Arrangements of eight and six eyes both occur in this family. Spermophora has a small globose abdomen and its eyes are arranged in two groups of three without median eyes. Pholcids are gray to brown, sometimes clear, with banding or chevron markings.

Identification 
These spiders have legs roughly 4 times as large as their bodies, making them look quite a lot like harvestmen (Opiliones). But they can be easily differentiated by the two segments this family have, harvestmen having fused segments. They can be further be distinguished by their irregular structure, and usually brown, tan or grey coloration.

Habitat
Pholcids are found in every continent in the world except Antarctica. Pholcids hang inverted in their messy and irregular-shaped webs. These webs are constructed in dark and damp recesses such as in caves, under rocks and loose bark, and in abandoned mammal burrows. In areas of human habitation pholcids construct webs in undisturbed areas in buildings such as high corners, attics and cellars, hence the common name "cellar spider".

Behavior

Trapping
The web of pholcids has no adhesive properties and instead relies on its irregular structure to trap prey. When pholcid spiders detect prey within their webs the spiders quickly envelop prey with silk-like material before inflicting a fatal bite. The prey may be eaten immediately or stored for later. When finished feeding they will clean the web by unhooking the remains of the prey and letting the carcass drop from the web. They are passive against humans.

Threat response
Some species of Pholcidae exhibit a threat response when disturbed by a touch to the web or entangled large prey. The arachnid responds by vibrating rapidly in a gyrating motion in its web, which may sometimes fall into a circular rhythm.  It may oscillate in tune with the elasticity of the web causing an oscillation larger than the motion of the spider's legs. While other species of spider exhibit this behaviour, such behavior by the Pholcidae species has led to these spiders sometimes being called "vibrating spiders". There are several proposed reasons for this threat response. The movement may make it difficult for a predator to locate or strike the spider, or may be a signal to an assumed rival to leave. Vibrating may also increase the chances of capturing insects that have just brushed their web and are still hovering nearby, or further entangle prey that may have otherwise been able to free itself. If the spider continues to be disturbed it will retreat into a corner or drop from its web and escape.

Diet
Although they do eat insects, certain species of these spiders invade webs of other spiders to eat the host, the eggs, or the prey. In some cases the spider vibrates the web of other spiders, mimicking the struggle of trapped prey to lure the host closer. Pholcids prey on Tegenaria funnel weaver spiders, and are known to attack and eat redback spiders, huntsman spiders and house spiders.
Pholcids may be beneficial to humans living in regions with dense hobo spider populations as predation on Tegenaria may keep populations in check. They have also been observed to feed on the spider Steatoda nobilis in countries like Ireland and England.

Gait
Pholcus phalangioides often uses an alternating tetrapod gait (first right leg, then second left leg, then third right leg, etc.), which is commonly found in many spider species. However, frequent variations from this pattern have been documented during observations of the spiders' movements.

Misconceptions
There is an urban legend that daddy long-legs spiders have the most potent venom of any spider but that their fangs are either too small or too weak to puncture human skin; the same legend is also repeated of the harvestman and crane fly, also known as "daddy long-legs" in some regions. Indeed, pholcid spiders do have a short fang structure (called uncate due to its "hooked" shape). Brown recluse spiders also have uncate fang structure, but are able to deliver medically significant bites.

Possible explanations include: pholcid venom is not toxic to humans; pholcid uncate are smaller than those of brown recluse; or there is a musculature difference between the two arachnids, with recluses, being hunting spiders, possessing stronger muscles for fang penetration. According to Rick Vetter of the University of California, Riverside, the daddy long-legs spider has never harmed a human, and there is no evidence that they are dangerous to humans.

The legend may result from the fact that the daddy long-legs spider preys upon deadly venomous spiders, such as the redback, a member of the black widow genus Latrodectus. To the extent that such arachnological information was known to the general public, it was perhaps thought that if the daddy long-legs spider could kill a spider capable of delivering fatal bites to humans, then it must be more venomous, and the uncate fangs were regarded as prohibiting it from killing people. In reality, it is able to cast lengths of silk onto its prey, incapacitating them from a safe distance.

Mythbusters experiment
During 2004, the Discovery Channel television show MythBusters tested the daddy long-legs venom myth in episode 13, "Buried in Concrete". Hosts Jamie Hyneman and Adam Savage first established that the spider's venom was not as toxic as other venoms, after being told about an experiment whereby mice were injected with venom from both a daddy long-legs and a black widow, with the black widow venom producing a much stronger reaction. After measuring the spider's fangs at approximately 0.25 mm, Adam Savage inserted his hand into a container with several daddy-long-legs, and reported that he felt a bite which produced a mild, short-lived burning sensation. The bite did in fact penetrate his skin, but did not cause any notable harm. Additionally, recent research has shown that pholcid venom is relatively weak in its effects on insects.

Genera

, the World Spider Catalog accepted the following genera:

Aetana Huber, 2005Asia, Fiji
Anansus Huber, 2007Africa
Anopsicus Chamberlin & Ivie, 1938Mexico, Ecuador, Caribbean, Central America
Apokayana Huber, 2018Malaysia, Indonesia
Arenita Huber & Carvalho, 2019Brazil
Arnapa Huber, 2019Indonesia, Papua New Guinea
Artema Walckenaer, 1837Asia, Africa
Aucana Huber, 2000Chile
Aymaria Huber, 2000South America
Belisana Thorell, 1898Asia, Oceania
Blancoa Huber, 2000Venezuela
Buitinga Huber, 2003Africa
Calapnita Simon, 1892Asia
Canaima Huber, 2000Trinidad, Venezuela
Cantikus Huber, 2018Asia
Carapoia González-Sponga, 1998South America
Cenemus Saaristo, 2001Seychelles
Chibchea Huber, 2000South America
Chisosa Huber, 2000Mexico, Aruba, United States
Ciboneya Pérez, 2001Cuba
Coryssocnemis Simon, 1893Trinidad, South America, Mexico, Central America
Crossopriza Simon, 1893Asia, Africa, United States, Venezuela, Germany, Australia
Enetea Huber, 2000Bolivia
Galapa Huber, 2000Ecuador
Gertschiola Brignoli, 1981Argentina
Giloloa Huber, 2019Indonesia
Guaranita Huber, 2000Argentina, Brazil
Hantu Huber, 2016Indonesia
Holocneminus Berland, 1942Asia, Samoa
Holocnemus Simon, 1873Spain, Italy, Portugal
Hoplopholcus Kulczyński, 1908Asia, Greece
Ibotyporanga Mello-Leitão, 1944Brazil
Ixchela Huber, 2000Mexico, Central America
Kairona Huber & Carvalho, 2019Brazil
Kambiwa Huber, 2000Brazil
Kelabita Huber, 2018Indonesia, Malaysia
Khorata Huber, 2005Asia
Kintaqa Huber, 2018Thailand, Malaysia
Leptopholcus Simon, 1893Asia, Africa
Litoporus Simon, 1893South America
Magana Huber, 2019Oman
Mecolaesthus Simon, 1893Caribbean, South America
Meraha Huber, 2018Asia
Mesabolivar González-Sponga, 1998South America, Trinidad
Metagonia Simon, 1893North America, South America, Central America, Caribbean
Micromerys Bradley, 1877Papua New Guinea, Australia
Micropholcus Deeleman-Reinhold & Prinsen, 1987Morocco, Caribbean, Europe, Asia, Australia
Modisimus Simon, 1893North America, Central America, Caribbean, Germany, Seychelles, Asia, Australia, South America
Muruta Huber, 2018Malaysia
Nerudia Huber, 2000Chile, Argentina
Ninetis Simon, 1890Africa, Yemen
Nipisa Huber, 2018Asia
Nita Huber & El-Hennawy, 2007Egypt, Iran, Uzbekistan
Nyikoa Huber, 2007Central Africa
Ossinissa Dimitrov & Ribera, 2005Canary Is.
Otavaloa Huber, 2000South America
Paiwana Huber, 2018Taiwan
Panjange Deeleman-Reinhold & Deeleman, 1983Asia, Oceania
Papiamenta Huber, 2000Curaçao
Paramicromerys Millot, 1946Madagascar
Pehrforsskalia Deeleman-Reinhold & van Harten, 2001Africa, Asia
Pemona Huber, 2019Venezuela
Pholcophora Banks, 1896United States, Canada, Mexico
Pholcus Walckenaer, 1805Asia, Europe, Africa, United States, Oceania
Physocyclus Simon, 1893North America, South America, Czech Republic, Asia, Australia, Central America
Pinocchio Huber & Carvalho, 2019Brazil
Pisaboa Huber, 2000Peru, Venezuela, Bolivia
Pomboa Huber, 2000Colombia
Pribumia Huber, 2018Asia
Priscula Simon, 1893South America
Psilochorus Simon, 1893North America, South America, Asia, New Zealand
Quamtana Huber, 2003Africa
Queliceria González-Sponga, 2003Venezuela
Saciperere Huber & Carvalho, 2019Brazil
Savarna Huber, 2005Thailand, Malaysia, Indonesia
Smeringopina Kraus, 1957Africa
Smeringopus Simon, 1890Africa, Asia, Australia
Spermophora Hentz, 1841Africa, Asia, Oceania, Germany, Brazil, United States
Spermophorides Wunderlich, 1992Africa, Europe
Stenosfemuraia González-Sponga, 1998Venezuela
Stygopholcus Absolon & Kratochvíl, 1932Croatia, Greece, Montenegro
Systenita Simon, 1893Venezuela
Tainonia Huber, 2000Hispaniola
Teranga Huber, 2018Indonesia, Philippines
Tibetia Zhang, Zhu & Song, 2006Tibet
Tissahamia Huber, 2018Asia
Tolteca Huber, 2000Mexico
Trichocyclus Simon, 1908Australia
Tupigea Huber, 2000Brazil
Uthina Simon, 1893Asia, Seychelles
Wanniyala Huber & Benjamin, 2005Sri Lanka
Waunana Huber, 2000Colombia, Ecuador, Panama
Wugigarra Huber, 2001Australia
Zatavua Huber, 2003Madagascar

References

Citations

General bibliography

External links

  Information and reference quality photos of cellar spiders. Includes QuickTime movie of spiders "vibrating".
 
 

 
Araneomorphae families
Taxa named by Carl Ludwig Koch
Urban legends